Deraniyagala is a town in the Kegalle district in the Sabaragamuwa Province of Sri Lanka. Deraniyaga city area consists major government administrative offices, textile industries and transportation hub and the district hospital which has seven medical officers including the DMO, Dr N.G.R.R.Senevirathne who upgraded this hospital into a good  condition including the ETU with standard facilities. Deraniyagala divisional secretariat area includes 214.6 km2 and population of about 46300. The divisional secreatariate includes 26 grama niladari divisions.

Economy
Agriculture is the main source of income for majority of the people. Tea and rubber are main sources of income for people in the area. The main source of food is from rice fields. Apart from tea and rubber, coconut, pepper, cardamom, nutmeg and other minor export crops are farmed throughout the area.

Climate
Deraniyagala has a tropical rainforest climate (Af) with heavy to very heavy rainfall year-round. It is one of the wettest towns in Sri Lanka.

References

Populated places in Sabaragamuwa Province